Avensa (Aerovías Venezolanas Sociedad Anonima) was a Venezuelan airline headquartered in Caracas. It was in the process of financial restructuring, after it went into bankruptcy due to poor management in 2002, with Santa Barbara Airlines taking over its routes, although a single Embraer EMB 120 Brasilia continued to carry the Avensa name in service until it was grounded for good in 2004. Avensa operated from its hub at Simon Bolivar International Airport in Maiquetía.

Even though the airline ceased operations more than a decade ago, around Venezuela's airports, Avensa relics can be seen everywhere: old check-in signs, rusted luggage carts, derelict airplane stairways, the name still visible through cracked blue paint around Venezuela's airports.

Although Avensa was reported to be in the process of economical restructuring, as of 2023, the airline has not been able to return to the skies.

History
Avensa was created on May 13, 1943, as a cargo airline by the Venezuelan businessman, Andres Boulton Pietri (1909-1994), and Pan American World Airways. Its first flight occurred in December 1943, flying cargo to Venezuela's oil-rich Carteru region with Ford Trimotors and Stinson Reliants. By 1944, Avensa had started passenger flights with Lockheed 10A twins.

After World War II, DC-3 Dakotas were added to the fleet. These were the backbone of the fleet until 1955 when Convair 340 twins were introduced for a new service to Miami. Avensa had set up an extensive domestic route network by the beginning of the 1960s. The airline also flew internationally to Miami, Aruba, Jamaica and New Orleans.

Avensa merged its international routes with the international routes of Línea Aeropostal Venezolana and the resulting network was the basis for a new international Venezuelan airline called Viasa, in which Avensa had a 45% holding. Avensa purchased jet equipment in the form of a single Sud Caravelle jet in 1964. Turboprop aircraft were introduced in 1966 when the airline purchased Convair 580s. McDonnell Douglas DC-9 jets were then introduced to give the airline a more competitive edge. Pan Am sold its 30% holding of Avensa to the Venezuelan government in 1976, making it completely state-owned.

Later, Avensa introduced the Boeing 727 and two Boeing 737-200s were later introduced. A fleet renewal program was set in motion at the end of the 1980s and new Boeing 737-200s were added. Two Boeing 757-200s were also introduced as part of the renewal program. These new aircraft were returned during the 1990s when Avensa fell into financial difficulties and had to make cut backs. This left the fleet with eleven aging Boeing 727s, five DC-9s and two 737-200s at the end of the 1990s.

Avensa took over many of the international routes formerly flown by Viasa after that airline collapsed in 1997. During the late 1990s, Avensa operated wide body McDonnell Douglas DC-10-30 flights to Europe including service to Lisbon, London, Madrid, Paris, Rome and Tenerife.  Avensa also controlled a smaller low-cost airline called Servivensa, which primarily operated the Boeing 727 and DC-9 jets. Avensa later served only a domestic network of three cities as it attempted to reestablish services during a time of continuing financial difficulties.

At one time it had its headquarters in the now Caracas City Government owned Torre El Chorro in Caracas, and in the Torre Humboldt complex in East Caracas.

Destinations

This is the list of places to which Avensa flew:

Domestic

Anaco
Barcelona
Barquisimeto
Caracas
Carúpano
Ciudad Bolivar
Cumaná
La Fría
Las Piedras
Maturín
Mérida
Porlamar
Puerto Ordaz
San Antonio del Táchira
Santa Bárbara del Zulia
Valencia
Valera
Maracaibo
San Tomé

International

Aruba
Bogota, Colombia
Bonaire
Curaçao
Lima, Peru
Lisbon, Portugal
London, UK
Madrid, Spain
Medellin, Colombia
Mexico City, Mexico
Miami, USA
Milan, Italy
Montreal, Canada (Charter)
New York City (JFK)
New Orleans, USA
Oporto, Portugal
Panama City, Panama
Paris, France
Quito, Ecuador
Rio de Janeiro, Brazil
Rome, Italy
Santiago de Compostela, Spain
São Paulo, Brazil
Tenerife, Spain
Toronto, Canada (Charter)

Fleet

Over the years, Avensa had operated the following aircraft:

Accidents and incidents
On August 20, 1948, a Douglas DC-3 disappeared off the coast of Las Piedras, Falcón State. All 3 crew members died.

On November 27, 1961, a Douglas DC-6B was hijacked by five armed students who forced the pilot to circle around Caracas while they dropped anti-Government leaflets on the city. After that, the crew was forced to fly them to Curaçao.

On February 25, 1962, a Fairchild F-27 was descending through thick clouds until it crashed into a mountain on departure from Margarita Island. All 23 occupants on board were killed.

On November 28, 1963, a Convair CV-440 (registered YV-C-AVH) was hijacked by six young rebels armed with machineguns shortly after it took off from Ciudad Bolívar. They forced the crew to circle around the city while they dropped leaflets. They were later demanded to be flown to Port of Spain, Trinidad and Tobago where they surrendered.

On March 21, 1968, a Convair CV-440 was hijacked to Cuba by three passengers.

On August 21, 1973, a Sud Aviation Caravelle (registered YV-C-AVI) was landing at Jacinto Lara International Airport in Barquisimeto when its wing struck the runway on touchdown. No one on board was killed, but the aircraft was damaged beyond repair.

On December 22, 1974, Avensa Flight 358 crashed in Maturín, shortly after take off due to a double engine failure. 77 passengers and crew were killed.

On March 11, 1983, Avensa Flight 007 crashed at Barquisimeto Airport. 22 passengers and one crew were killed.

See also
List of defunct airlines of Venezuela

References

External links

Avensa 
Avensa (Archive)
Avensa in airliners.net

 
Defunct airlines of Venezuela
Airlines established in 1943
Airlines disestablished in 2004
1943 establishments in Venezuela